The American Society for the Prevention of Cruelty to Animals (ASPCA) is a non-profit organization dedicated to preventing animal cruelty. Based in New York City since its inception in 1866, the organization's mission is "to provide effective means for the prevention of cruelty to animals throughout the United States."

History

Following the creation of the Royal Society for the Prevention of Cruelty to Animals (RSPCA) in the United Kingdom in 1824 (given Royal status in 1840), Henry Bergh founded the American Society for the Prevention of Cruelty to Animals on April 10, 1866, in New York City on the belief that "animals are entitled to kind and respectful treatment at the hands of humans, and must be protected under the law". It is the oldest animal welfare organization in the United States. On February 8, 1866, Bergh pleaded on behalf of animals at a meeting at Clinton Hall in New York City. Some of the issues he discussed were cockfighting and the horrors of slaughterhouses. After getting signatures for his "Declaration of the Rights of Animals," Bergh was given an official charter to incorporate the ASPCA on April 10, 1866. On April 19, 1866, the first anti-cruelty law was passed In NY since the founding of ASPCA, and the organization was granted the right to enforce anti-cruelty laws. In 1867, ASPCA operated its first ambulance for injured horses and began advocating for more humane treatment of animals such as horses, live pigeons, cats, and dogs. Early goals of ASPCA focused on efforts for horses and livestock, since at the time they were used for a number of activities.

In 1918, ASPCA veterinarians developed the use of anesthesia and as a result were able to work on a horse with a broken kneecap.
In 1954, ASPCA hospitals added pathology and radiography laboratories and programs. In 1961, ASPCA veterinarians performed their first open-heart surgery on a dog.

From 1894 to 1994, the ASPCA operated the municipal animal shelter system in New York City which euthanized unadopted animals. Starting in 1977, the ASPCA entered into a contract with the New York City Department of Health to receive municipal funding to operate the shelter system. The contract rendered the ASPCA increasingly reliant on government income rather than private donations, and subject to the effects of annual city budget appropriations. In 1993, the ASPCA decided not to renew its contract for operating the shelter system. Operation of the shelter system was transferred to Center for Animal Care and Control, later renamed Animal Care Centers of NYC, in 1995.

In 1996, the ASPCA acquired the Animal Poison Control Center from the University of Illinois. In 2013, the ASPCA made a $25 million commitment to assist at-risk animals and pet owners in the greater Los Angeles metropolitan area, including a fully subsidized spay/neuter facility in South Los Angeles operated by the ASPCA and a campaign to encourage the fostering of local vulnerable kittens.

In 2014, the ASPCA spoke out in support of new New York City mayor Bill de Blasio's campaign to ban horse-drawn carriages in the city.

In 2014, the ASPCA opened the Gloria Gurney Canine Annex for Recovery & Enrichment (CARE) in NYC to house dogs brought by the NYPD to the ASPCA in connection with animal cruelty investigations. In 2014, the ASPCA also opened the ASPCA Kitten Nursery in NYC to care for neonate and very young homeless kittens until they are appropriate for adoption.

In 2015, the ASPCA acquired the Asheville, NC-based Humane Alliance, now called the ASPCA Spay/Neuter Alliance.

In 2018, the ASPCA established the ASPCA Behavioral Rehabilitation Center. Located in Weaverville, North Carolina, the Center provides behavioral rehabilitation to canine victims of cruelty and neglect. The Center’s Learning Lab also disseminates rehabilitative aid and training to shelters around the country.

In 2019, the ASPCA opened the ASPCA Community Veterinary Center in Liberty City, Miami, FL to provide subsidized veterinary services for an undeserved community. It also took over responsibility for The Right Horse Initiative as an official program of the ASPCA in 2019.

In 2020, the ASPCA opened the ASPCA Community Veterinary Center in the Bronx, New York.

In 2020, the ASPCA launched a series of programs in response to the COVID-19 pandemic and its effect on pets, owners, and communities including free pet food for dogs, cats, and horses in New York City, Los Angeles, Miami, and Asheville, grants to animal welfare organizations, emergency pet boarding services, a New York City COVID-19 Pet Hotline, and expanded stationary and mobile veterinary care.

In 2021, the ASPCA opened the ASPCA Community Veterinary Center supported by the Alex and Elisabeth Lewyt Charitable Trust, in NYC.

Controversy 
In 2012, the ASPCA agreed to pay Ringling Bros. and Barnum & Bailey Circus $9.3 million to settle a lawsuit regarding the ASPCA's false allegations of animal cruelty by the circus. Courts found that ASPCA activists had paid the key witness, a former Ringling barn helper, at least $190,000, making him "essentially a paid plaintiff" who lacked credibility. Edwin J. Sayres stepped down as CEO in 2012, and in 2013 longtime ASPCA staff member Matthew Bershadker was named president and CEO.

In 2021 CBS News did a piece on ASPCA showing that funds aren't necessarily going where donors believe they are going. For example, from 2008 to 2020, the ASPCA raised more than $2 billion for animal welfare. In that time, it has spent $146 million, or about 7% of the total money raised, in grants to local animal welfare groups. But during that same time period it spent nearly three times that, at least $421 million, on fundraising. About 40 miles away from the ASPCA's headquarters in Manhattan, Gary Rogers is the president of the Nassau County SPCA stated - "I don't know how they can put their head on a pillow at night, knowing that there are so many animals out here that that money could be used for, for other things."

Legislation and litigation
The ASPCA’s Government Relations, Legal Advocacy and Investigations departments work with state and federal lawmakers and engage in legislative and litigation efforts to secure stronger legal protections for animals.

Some of the animal welfare issues the departments work on include ending puppy mills and breed-specific legislation.

In 2019, the ASPCA sued the U.S. Department of Agriculture for access to animal breeder inspection records.

National cruelty and field response 

At the invitation of local agencies, the ASPCA deploys to sites of large-scale animal abuse, animal neglect, natural disasters, or man-made disasters in which animals are at risk. Teams, including National Field Response, Legal Advocacy and Investigations, Forensic Sciences, the Cruelty Recovery Center, Relocation and the Behavioral Sciences team, engage in animal rescue efforts. They provide behavioral and medical treatment for the animals and support the prosecution of criminal cases with forensic science, evidence collection and analysis, and legal and expert testimony support.

Cases involving torture, killings and mistreatment of animals are some examples of cases handled by the ASPCA. A common example was displayed in the news in October 2008, when the ASPCA was in charge of an investigation involving the slaughtering of a beagle that lived in the Bronx. Brian McCafferty was charged with torturing and injuring his wife's beagle, Jerry, after an argument with his wife. The ASPCA conducted a necropsy that concluded that Jerry was stabbed twice and shot in the neck with a rifle. McCafferty claims that he was acting in self-defense when the dog attacked him. He was eventually released on bail.

In 2016, ASPCA field deployment teams participated in a large animal cruelty rescue operation, rescuing nearly 700 animals from an unlicensed facility in North Carolina.

Other large-scale ASPCA rescues included providing emergency sheltering and assistance for approximately 1,300 animals displaced during the Joplin tornado in 2011, and assisting with the care of 367 dogs in Alabama, Mississippi and Georgia in 2013 ,in what is believed to be the second-largest dogfighting raid in U.S. history.

In September 2013, after many years of providing humane law enforcement services in NYC, the ASPCA and the New York City Police Department announced a collaboration to provide enhanced protection to New York City’s animals. In this partnership, the NYPD responds to all animal cruelty complaints throughout New York City, while the ASPCA provides medical and behavioral care for animal cruelty victims and provides legal and forensic assistance in the prosecution of cases. The ASPCA Community Engagement team also works closely with the NYPD to connect pets in need to services such as medical care, grooming and pet supplies.

In 2020, the ASPCA also opened the ASPCA Veterinary Forensic Science Center in Gainesville, Florida, to assist law enforcement with animal cruelty investigations and prosecutions.

Welfare of farm animals and horses 
The ASPCA’s Farm Animal Welfare Program features a “Shop With Your Heart” campaign that guides consumers on making animal welfare-conscious food buying decisions including seeking out meat, egg, and dairy products certified by one of three credible animal welfare certifications, including Global Animal Partnership (GAP), and exploring more plant-based food options.

The ASPCA’s Right Horse Initiative is focused on increasing the number of successful horse adoptions in the U.S. and improving the number of positive outcomes for horses in transition as they move from one home, career, or owner to the next.

Animal relocation 
ASPCA works with other animal welfare organizations and rescue groups to relocate animals from areas with high rates of euthanasia in animal shelters to locations with higher adoption rates. Often, animals are moved from the southern to northern U.S. states. Animals may be transported using aircraft or vehicles, sometimes being relayed between transporters multiple times along the way. As of March 2022, ASPCA had a fleet of 18 vans used for transport. The organization relocated approximately 200,000 animals between 2017 and 2022.

Presidents and chairpersons

See also

Humane Society of the United States
List of animal rights groups
People for the Ethical Treatment of Animals

Notes

References
Much of the content of this article is based on information from the official ASPCA website:

External links
Finding aid for the ASPCA Papers, 1868-1889 at the Museum of the City of New York

1866 establishments in New York (state)
Animal charities based in the United States
Animal rights organizations
Animal welfare organizations based in the United States
Charities based in New York City
Cruelty to animals
Organizations established in 1866
Wikipedia articles with undisclosed paid content from November 2021